Minyagon is an agricultural village in Homalin Township, Hkamti District, in the Sagaing Region of northwestern Burma. Extensive fields surround the village.

References

External links
Maplandia World Gazetteer

Populated places in Hkamti District
Homalin Township